is a Japanese manufacturer of zinc related products. Established in 1937, it smelts nonferrous metals such as lead and zinc and produces electronic components.  There are seven branches in Japan and two branches in China, in Hong Kong and Shanghai.  The company was responsible for cadmium poisoning on Tsushima Island in the late twentieth century.

The company is Japan’s third-biggest producer of zinc.

Operations
Toho Zinc has four manufacturing sites in Japan:

 Annaka smelter and refinery with zinc smelting and refining operations
 Chigirishima smelter and refinery with lead smelting and refining operations 
 Onahama smelter and refinery recycling operations
 Fujioka Works at which electronic components and materials are produced

References

External links

Toho Zinc official website 
Toho Zinc official website 

Electronics companies of Japan
Mining companies of Japan
Manufacturing companies based in Tokyo
Companies listed on the Tokyo Stock Exchange
Manufacturing companies established in 1937
Japanese brands
Japanese companies established in 1937